Salomo Savolainen (30 September 1883, Maaninka - 9 June 1964) was a Finnish salesperson, warehouse manager and politician. He was imprisoned from 1918 to 1921 for having sided with the Reds during the Finnish Civil War. He was a member of the Parliament of Finland from 1927 to 1929, representing the Socialist Electoral Organisation of Workers and Smallholders (STPV).

References

1883 births
1964 deaths
People from Maaninka
People from Kuopio Province (Grand Duchy of Finland)
Socialist Electoral Organisation of Workers and Smallholders politicians
Members of the Parliament of Finland (1927–29)
People of the Finnish Civil War (Red side)
Prisoners and detainees of Finland